Jesús Tadeo Vega (born 23 May 1994) is a Mexican racewalking athlete. He qualified to represent Mexico at the 2020 Summer Olympics in Tokyo 2021, competing in men's 20 kilometres walk.

References

External links
 

 

1994 births
Living people
Mexican male racewalkers
Athletes (track and field) at the 2020 Summer Olympics
Olympic athletes of Mexico
Athletes from Mexico City
21st-century Mexican people